The Smoke + Mirrors Tour was the second worldwide concert tour by American alternative rock band Imagine Dragons in support of their second studio album Smoke + Mirrors (2015). The tour had a preview show in Sydney, Australia, on March 17, 2015, before the tour officially began in Santiago, Chile, on April 12, 2015. It continued through the Americas, Asia, Oceania and Europe until February 5, 2016, in Amsterdam, Netherlands. The band played 108 shows. For Pollstar's Year End Top 200 North American Tours of 2015, it was ranked forty-first, and grossed $25.2 million.

Background and development
In 2012, Imagine Dragons released their debut studio album Night Visions, which launched the band into international mainstream commercial success. To promote the record, the band embarked on a world tour, named Night Visions Tour, consisting of over 170 shows all over the world. During this tour, the band had been working for their second album.

On December 16, 2014, Imagine Dragons announced that their second album Smoke + Mirrors would be released on February 17, 2015 and the tour was announced shortly later.

The arena tour in United Kingdom was announced on January 30, 2015. On the same day, the rest of the European leg was revealed through the band official Facebook with "more dates to come on". The North American leg was announced a week later, meanwhile the shows in Australia and New Zealand were confirmed in middle February.

The show that took place in Toronto, Ontario on July 4, was recorded and released as a concert DVD, Imagine Dragons: Smoke + Mirrors Live.

Critical reception

North America
The concert at the Nationwide Arena in Columbus received a positive review from Curtis Schieber from The Columbus Dispatch, saying that whilst "no wheels were reinvented during the Imagine Dragons concert" he acknowledged that it "delivered all its considerable drama with bull's-eye accuracy in a very appealing package that featured a charismatic lead singer, an expert four-piece band [...] and a relatively restrained set that looked like a million bucks and skilfully built momentum." Gene Stout of The Seattle Times have a generally positive review of the concert at the Tacoma Dome in Tacoma, stating that "high-powered songs as 'On Top of the World', 'Radioactive' and the drum-laden 'I Bet My Life' were a bit overdone. But fans loved them." Stout noted that the "concertgoers spanned generations, from kids attending their first concert to middle-aged rockers who discovered the band in Vegas" as well as complimenting the opening acts, Metric and Halsey, calling them a "bonus".

Oceania
George Palathingal of The Sydney Morning Herald gave the show at the Qantas Credit Union Arena in Sydney four stars, summing up that "these Dragons do indeed breathe some fire". He also commented "I'm So Sorry" and "Friction" as highlights, with the latter dispelling "fears that Imagine Dragons might be a bit too "pop" and not nearly "rock" enough". Rachel Bache of The New Zealand Herald gave the concert at the Vector Arena in Auckland a positive review said from the opening of "Shots" the band "oozed energy", whilst also saying that the "bright white strobes did get a bit much".

Opening acts

The Mills (April 21, 2015)
Vivanativa (April 23, 2015)
Odiesso (April 27, 2015)
 Metric (June 3 – August 1, 2015)
 Halsey (June 3 – August 1, 2015)
 British India (September 2 – 5, 2015)
The Rubens (September 8 & 10, 2015)
Sunset Sons (October 11, 2015 – January 30, 2016 & February 5, 2016)
Pravada (January 24 & 26, 2016)
The Biebers (January 20, 2016)
GJan (January 31, 2016)
Lemon (February 2, 2016)

Set list
This set list is representative of the performance on July 4, 2015, in Toronto, Ontario, Canada. It does not represent all concerts for the duration of the tour.

"Shots"
"Trouble"
"It's Time"
"Forever Young" (Alphaville cover)
"Smoke and Mirrors"
"Polaroid"
"I'm So Sorry"
"Thief"
"Gold"
"Bleeding Out" / "Warriors"
"Demons"
"Amsterdam"
"Hopeless Opus"
"On Top of the World"
"Friction"
"Release"
"I Bet My Life"
"Radioactive"
Encore

"The Fall"

Tour dates

Box office score data

Notes

References

2015 concert tours
2016 concert tours
Imagine Dragons concert tours